Ann Jane Wenham Figgins (26 November 1927 – 15 November 2018), known professionally as Jane Wenham, was an English film and television actress born in Southampton, Hampshire.

Wenham made her film debut in the adaptation of J. B. Priestley's An Inspector Calls (1954). From 1957 to 1961, she was married to the actor Albert Finney, with whom she had a son, Simon, who is a cameraman.

Wenham died in November 2018, eleven days before her 91st birthday.

Filmography

Film

Television

References

External links
 

1927 births
2018 deaths
Actresses from Southampton
English film actresses
English stage actresses
English television actresses